Vinay Varma is an Indian actor, script writer, and casting director who primarily works in Telugu and Hindi films.

Career 

Vinay Varma, founder of Sutradhar started out as an amateur theatre practitioner. He has been involved with theatre for more than thirty years. He's also been a part of more than 15 feature films in Hindi, Telugu, Tamil, and a Hollywood film.

He started his theater career with the play Coffee House Mein Intezar written by Dr. Laxminarayan Lal, on 14 September 1980.  was directed by Dr. D.K. Goel.  Varma left his lucrative Bank Officer job to pursue his passion. He believes,"one life one passion".

He has directed over 30 plays and acted in more than 50 plays with over 200 shows across India and abroad. Some of his  performances are in Natasamrat, Raktbeej, Main Rahi Masoom, Siyaah Haashiye, Stronger Than Superman, Main Nathuram Godse, Death Watch, Kanjoos Makkhi Choose, David Mamet's Oleanna. His play Main Rahi Masoom which is based on the life and times of writer Dr Rahi Masoom Raza. Besides Hyderabad, Main Rahi Masoom has been performed in Kala Ghoda Arts Festival – Mumbai, 3rd Minerva National Theatre Festival – Kolkata, Pratyay Theatre Festival – Kolhapur, 12th Bharath Rang Mahotsav – New Delhi, 22nd National Drama Festival – Allahabad, 8th World Theatre Olympics-Chandigarh, Film and Television Institute of India-Pune. It was also performed in Chennai, Ahmedabad, Indore, Bengaluru etc. Vinay Varma was also invited by the Society of Friends International, London, to stage Main Rahi Masoom. On 2 March 2018, Main Rahi Masoom celebrated its 50th show, at Ravindra Bharathi, Hyderabad, India.

As a Theatre Director, some of his well-known plays are:
 John Pielmeier's Agnes of God.
 Dr. C.H. Phansalkar's Isosceles Triangle.
 Birjees Qadar Ka Kunba, an Urdu adaptation of The House of Bernarda Alba.
 Pinki Virani's Bitter Chocolate.
 Badal Sarkar's Ballabhpur ki Roopkatha
 Dr. Shanker Shesh's Raktbeej.
 Dr. Shanker Shesh's Phandi.
 Dr. Prem Janmejai's Sita Apaharan Case.
 Sagar Sarhadi's Kisi Seema Ki Ek Mamooli Si Ghatna.
 Surendra Verma's Maranoparant.
 Neem Hakim Khatar e Jaan, a Hyderabadi adaptation of Le Médecin malgré lui.
 Saadat Hasan Manto's Siyaah Haashiye (co-directed with Deepti Girotra).
 Ismat Chughtai's Ismat – Ek Aurat.
 Gandhi Ambedkar and Main Nathuram Godse (co-directed with Prof. Bhasker Shewalker)
 Mah Laqa Bai Chanda, based on the life of Mah Laqa Bai, an 18th-century Urdu poet and the first woman to have a diwan (anthology) of her work.
 Kanjoos Makkhi Choose, a Hyderabadi adaptation of The Miser.
 Nirmal Verma's Weekend.

Voice work 

Varma had lent his voice in Urdu, English, and Hindi, for various Ad-Films, Documentaries, Corporate Films, and Educational Films. He also dubs for Telugu films. He has dubbed for Rahul Dev in Telugu film Akasa Veedhilo, for Paresh Rawal in Mechanic Mavayya, for Tinnu Anand in Telugu film Anji (film), for Nassar (actor) in Okkadunnadu, for the main villain in Vijay Devarakonda starrer Dear Comrade, for Tamil actor Ilavarasu in Donga (Telugu version of Karthi starrer Thambi (2019 film)), and for many other interesting characters.

Workshops 

Varma has been conducting Acting, Voice, and Body Language Workshops at Sutradhar since 1999, and has identified and trained more than a hundred talents. Some well-known faces trained by him are Vijay Varma, Sree Vishnu, Aditi Sharma (Ahana of Kasam Tere Pyaar Ki), and Vijay Deverakonda.

Theatre 
 Aarop (Actor)
 Bitter Chocolate (Actor/Director)
 Bus Stop (Actor)
 Deathwatch (Actor)
 Four Dimensions (Actor/Director)
 Gadha Ya Aadmi (Voice over for leather puppetry show)
 Gandhi Ambedkar (Actor/Co-Director)
 Godse – An Assassin speaks (Actor/Director)
 Good Bye Swami (Actor)
 Inspector Matadeen Chand Par (Actor)
 Isosceles Triangle (Actor/Director)
 Jaal – Dramatised play reading (Actor/Director)
 Kissa Karodimal Ki Laash Ka (Actor/Director)
 Kanjoos Makkhi Choose (Actor/Director)
 Main Nathuram Godse (Actor/Co-Director)
 Main Rahi Masoom (Actor)
 Maranoparant (Actor/Director)
 Natasamrat (Actor)
 Neem Hakim Khatar e Jaan (Actor/Director)
 Oleanna (Actor)
 On Vacation (Actor/Director)
 Pushp (Actor)
 Raktbeej (Actor/Director)
 Room No 13 Block No 14 (Actor)
 Saiyyan Bhaye Kotwal (Actor/Director)
 Shanivaar ke 2 Baje (Actor)
 Sita Apharan Case (Actor/Director)
 Siyaah Haashiye (Actor/Co-Director)
 Stronger Than Superman (Actor)
 The Stronger (Director)
 Voids, Spaces & Borders (Actor/Director)
 Andhere Mein (Actor/Director)
 Weekend (Director)
 Abbey! Em Ledu (Director)
 Aadhi Raat Ke Baad (Director)

Filmography

Hindi 

 16 December
 Rudraksh
 Mukhbiir
 Knock Out
 Bobby Jasoos
 Yeh Hai Bakrapur
 The Virgin Goat/Laadli Laila
 Lakshman Rekha : The Unwritten Law (Short film)
 Music School (Upcoming movie) (Actor, Casting Director, Dialogue Writer)
 Jersey as Krishna Rao

Telugu 

 Love, 2001
 Tapana
 Nee Thodu Kavali
 Danger
 Veedhi
 Ninnu Kalisaka
 Nippu
 Ko Antey Koti
 Dream
 Zindagi
 Anaamika
 Gentleman
 Terror
 Aravinda Sametha Veera Raghava
 Evaru
 George Reddy
 Idam Jagath
 Meeku Maathrame Cheptha
 Dorasaani (2019 film)
 Boy (2019)
 V (as Sadik Hassan) (2020)
 IIT Krishnamurthy  (ACP Vinay Varma) (2020)
 Zombie Reddy
 Naandhi
 Aakashavaani as Dora
 Drushyam 2 (CI Pratap)
 Waltair Veerayya
 Music School (Upcoming movie) (Actor, Casting Director, Dialogue Writer)

English 
 Beeper

Web series 
A Simple Murder (2020) Sacred Games (TV series) (Cameo in Season 2, Episode 1)
Game (2021) on Hungama
Qubool Hai?  (2022) on Aha as Pehelwan Rafeequddin

Television 
 Peter the 2 (Telefilm)
 Madhavi
 Daanav Hunters
 Dharti Baney Phulwari
 Naghme ka Safar
 Main Phir Janma Hoon (Telefilm)
 Bala
 Ek Kahani
 Manushulu-Mamathalu

Dubbing artist
Tinu Anand - Anji
Ilavarasu - Donga
Paresh Rawal - Mechanic Mavayya
Nassar - Okkadunnadu
Raj Arjun - Dear Comrade
Rahul Dev - Akasa Veedhilo

References

External links 

  Personal website

Living people
Male actors from Hyderabad, India
Year of birth missing (living people)